Speed Racer in The Challenge of Racer X was a game designed by Accolade. The objective of the game is to challenge Racer X on various race circuits until there is one winner. A Sega Genesis version was planned but never released.  Plans for a SNES version later evolved into a companion game, Speed Racer in My Most Dangerous Adventures.

Gameplay 
Players compete against Racer X and other drivers in six different courses, either using the Mach Five or the Shooting Star.  Players can also purchase and upgrade the Mach 5's special functions to gain advantages over the opponents.

Development
The Challenge of Racer X originally began development for the Sega Genesis and the Super Nintendo Entertainment System and several advertisements for such versions have surfaced.  While the Sega Genesis version was never released, the planned SNES version was eventually released in 1994 as Speed Racer in My Most Dangerous Adventures, a significantly different game that intersperses racing and side-scrolling platforming action.  Accolade's decision to make the SNES game different than The Challenge of Racer X was attributed to both systems' differing capabilities and target audience.

Reception
Computer Gaming World in January 1994 criticized Speed Racer, stating that "any computer game enthusiast will laugh at the graphics", Pole Position and Out Run were superior in "driveability", and there were "several serious bugs". The magazine concluded that despite "being built on a solid idea ... it was very easy to park this game in the lot of disappointments".

In 1996, Computer Gaming World declared Speed Racer the 28th-worst computer game ever released.

References

External links

Speed Racer in The Challenge of Racer X at UK GameSpot

1992 video games
Accolade (company) games
Cancelled Sega Genesis games
DOS games
DOS-only games
Racing video games
Challenge of Racer X
Video games developed in the United States
Multiplayer and single-player video games